Çağla Baş Atakal (born Çağla Baş on July 26, 1992), aka Çağla Atakal, is a Turkish female paralympic shooter competing in the air rifle events. She qualified to represent Turkey at the 2016 Summer Paralympics in Rio de Janeiro. Baş also plays on a wheelchair basketball team at a national level.

Early life
Çağla Baş was born in Altınordu district of Ordu Province, Turkey on July 26, 1992. She lives in her hometown.

She married Erdem Atakal in December 2014 after being together for 7 years. She drew the attention of her future husband during a wheelchair basketball game she was playing in Istanbul.

Sporting career
Baş began her sporting career at eleven of age by playing basketball. She is a member of the wheelchair basketball team of Altınordu Belediyespor in her hometown. Encouraged by her mother, she entered also Paralympic shooting in 2008. She competes in the R2 40 shots 10m air rifle standing SH1 women's, R3 10m 60 shots air rifle prone SH1 mixed  and FTR1 10m falling targets rifle SH1 mixed events. The SH1 classification is for Paralympic athletes, who can shoot without the need of a shooting stand to support the firearm. Her coach is Tolga Korkusuz.

Baş became bronze medalist seven years in a row at national competitions.

Representing her country, she took part at the IPC Shooting World Championships 2010 held in Zagreb, Croatia and 2014 in Suhl, Germany, at the
IPC Shooting World Cup 2013 in Szczecin, Poland, 2015 in Antalya, Turkey, 2016 in Bangkok, Thailand, and at the 2013 IPC Shooting European Championships in Alicante, Spain.

She won a silver medal in the R2 SH1 event, and another silver medal in the FTR1 SH1 mixed event at the 2013 IPC Shooting World Cup in Poland, a bronze medal in the R3 SH1 mixed event at the  2015 World Cup in Turkey, a silver medal in the R2 SH1 event at the 2014 IPC Shooting World Championships. The success in 2014 brought her a quota place at the 2016 Rio Olympics. This will be her first participation at the Paralympics.

References

1992 births
Sportspeople from Ordu
Turkish women's wheelchair basketball players
Paralympic shooters of Turkey
People with paraplegia
Turkish female sport shooters
Wheelchair category Paralympic competitors
Shooters at the 2016 Summer Paralympics
Living people